John Bridcut is an English documentary filmmaker, best known for his films about British composers. His most famous work, Britten's Children (2004), is a study of the influence that Benjamin Britten's close relationships with children had on the composer and material from the documentary was later made into a book (2006).

He has also created documentaries about Ralph Vaughan Williams (The Passions of Vaughan Williams, 2008), Edward Elgar (The Man Behind the Mask, 2010) and Hubert Parry (The Prince and the Composer, 2011), the latter a collaboration with Charles, Prince of Wales, whom he had earlier profiled in Charles at 60: The Passionate Prince.
In November 2018, after being given 12 months exclusive access to Charles, Prince of Wales, Bridcut's film Prince, Son and Heir: Charles at 70 was first aired by the BBC.  Other documentaries by Bridcut include studies of Queen Elizabeth II, Rudolf Nureyev, Roald Dahl and Hillary Clinton.

References

English documentary filmmakers
Living people
People educated at Radley College
Year of birth missing (living people)
Britten scholars